The Norwegian Metallic Silhouette Association, Norwegian Norges Metallsilhuettforbund (NMF), is the Norwegian association for metallic silhouette shooting, a shooting sport originating from Mexico. NMF is affiliated internationally with International Metallic Silhouette Shooting Union (IMSSU). The shooting sport entered Norway in 1978, and NMF was established in 1981. Norway was the first country to hold the European Championship in Metallic Shooting at the Løvenskiold Shooting Range in 1986, an event which was repeated in 1988.

See also 
 List of shooting sports organizations

Other shooting sport organizations in Norway 
 Det frivillige Skyttervesen
 Norwegian Shooting Association
 Dynamic Sports Shooting Norway
 Norwegian Association of Hunters and Anglers
 Norwegian Benchrest Shooting Association
 Norwegian Black Powder Union
 Norwegian Biathlon Association
 Scandinavian Western Shooters

References 

1981 establishments in Norway
Sports organisations of Norway